Gerard "Gerry" Collins (born March 26, 1952) is an Irish retired slalom canoeist who competed in the 1970s. He finished 24th in the K-1 event at the 1972 Summer Olympics in Munich.

References

Canoeists at the 1972 Summer Olympics
Irish male canoeists
Living people
Olympic canoeists of Ireland
1952 births